is a prefectural museum in Kanazawa, Japan, dedicated to the history and culture of Ishikawa Prefecture. The three ICP red brick buildings date to 1909-14 and functioned first as the local arsenal, then after the Pacific War as the Kanazawa College of Art, before being converted into a museum in 1986.

See also

 List of Historic Sites of Japan (Ishikawa)
 Kaga Province
 Noto Province
 Ishikawa Prefectural Museum of Art

References

External links
  Ishikawa Prefectural History Museum

Museums in Ishikawa Prefecture
Buildings and structures in Kanazawa, Ishikawa
History museums in Japan
Prefectural museums
Museums established in 1986
1986 establishments in Japan